Syriac literature is literature in the Syriac language. It is a tradition going back to the Late Antiquity. It is strongly associated with Syriac Christianity.

Terminology
In modern Syriac studies, and also within the wider field of Aramaic studies, the term Syriac literature is most commonly used as a shortened designation for Classical Syriac literature, that is written in Classical Syriac language, an old literary and liturgical language of Syriac Christianity. It is sometimes also used as a designation for Modern Syriac literature or Neo-Syriac literature, written in Modern Syriac (Eastern Neo-Aramaic) languages. In the wider sense, the term is often used as designation for both Classical Syriac and Modern Syriac literature, but its historical scope is even wider, since Syrian/Syriac labels were originally used by ancient Greeks as designations for Aramaic language in general, including literature written in all variants of that language. Such plurality of meanings, both in ancient literary texts and in modern scholarly works, is further enhanced by the conventional scholarly exclusion of Western Aramaic heritage from the Syriac corpus, a practice that stands in contradiction not only with historical scope of the term, but also with well attested self-designations of native Syriac-speaking communities. Since the term Syriac literature continues to be used differently among scholars, its meanings are remaining dependent on the context of every particular use.

Classical Syriac literature

Early Syriac texts date to the 2nd century, notably the old versions Syriac Bible and the Diatesseron Gospel harmony. The bulk of Syriac literary production dates to between the 4th and 8th centuries. Syriac literacy survived into the 9th century, but Syriac Christian authors in this period increasingly write in Arabic.

"Classical Syriac language" is the term for the literary language as was developed by the 3rd century. The language of the first three centuries of the Christian era is also known as "Old Syriac" (but sometimes subsumed under "Classical Syriac").

The earliest Christian literature in  Syriac was biblical translation, the Peshitta and the Diatessaron. 
Bardaisan was an important non-Christian (Gnostic) author of the 2nd century, but most of his works are lost and only known from later references. An important testimony of early Syriac is the letter of Mara bar Serapion, possibly written in the late 1st century (but extant in a 6th- or 7th-century copy).

The 4th century is considered to be the golden age of Syriac literature. The two giants of this period are Aphrahat, writing homilies for the church in the Persian Empire, and Ephrem the Syrian, writing hymns, poetry and prose for the church just within the Roman Empire. The next two centuries, which are in many ways a continuation of the golden age, sees important Syriac poets and theologians: Jacob of Serugh, Narsai, Philoxenus of Mabbog, Babai the Great, Isaac of Nineveh and Jacob of Edessa.

There were substantial efforts to translate Greek texts into Syriac. A number of works originally written in Greek survive only in Syriac translation. Among these are several works by Severus of Antioch (d. 538), translated by Paul of Edessa (fl. 624). A Life of Severus was written by Athanasius I Gammolo (d. 635).
National Library of Russia, Codex Syriac 1 is a  manuscript of a Syriac version of the Eusebian Ecclesiastical History dated to AD 462.

After the Islamic conquests of the mid-7th century, the process of hellenization of Syriac, which was prominent in the sixth and seventh centuries, slowed and ceased. Syriac entered a silver age from around the ninth century. The works of this period were more encyclopedic and scholastic, and include the biblical commentators Ishodad of Merv and Dionysius bar Salibi. Crowning the silver age of Syriac literature is the thirteenth-century polymath Bar-Hebraeus.

The conversion of the Mongols to Islam began a period of retreat and hardship for Syriac Christianity and its adherents. However, there has been a continuous stream of Syriac literature in Upper Mesopotamia and the Levant from the fourteenth century through to the present day.

Modern Syriac literature
The emergence of vernacular Neo-Aramaic (Modern Syriac) is conventionally dated to the late medieval period, but there are a number of authors that continued to produce literary works in Classical Syriac up to the early modern period, and literary Syriac continues to be in use among members of the Syriac Orthodox Church.

Modern Syriac literature includes works in various colloquial Eastern Aramaic Neo-Aramaic languages still spoken by Assyrian Christians. This Neo-Syriac literature bears a dual tradition: it continues the traditions of the Syriac literature of the past, and it incorporates a converging stream of the less homogeneous spoken language. The first such flourishing of Neo-Syriac was the seventeenth century literature of the School of Alqosh, in northern Iraq. This literature led to the establishment of Assyrian Neo-Aramaic and so called Chaldean Neo-Aramaic as written literary languages. In the nineteenth century, printing presses were established in Urmia, in northern Iran. This led to the establishment of the 'General Urmian' dialect of Assyrian Neo-Aramaic as the standard in much Neo-Syriac Assyrian literature. The comparative ease of modern publishing methods has encouraged other colloquial Neo-Aramaic languages, like Turoyo and Senaya, to begin to produce literature.

List of Syriac writers

See also

References

Sources

External links

HUGOYE: Journal of Syriac Studies 
Syriac Literature
Beth Mardutho: The Syriac Computing Institute

 
Literature
Christian literature
Syriac language
Aramaic languages